Poyracık is a town in Kınık district of İzmir Province, Turkey. At  it is very close to Kınık. The population of the town is 5760   as of 2011. Poyracık is an old town and its history can be traced back to Gambrion of the 4th century BC. It was an important settlement during Pergamon state. In the middle age it became a part of Byzantine Empire . Sasa bey (a Turkmen bey  of  Aydınoğlu beylik) captured the town and finally it became a part of the Ottoman Empire. In 1937 it was declared a seat of township.

References

Populated places in İzmir Province
Towns in Turkey
Kınık District